Charles Stanley "Herb" Kuta (born 1956) is an American electronics engineer and software engineer who was a co-founder of Silicon Graphics, a major graphics workstation manufacturer.

Biography
Charles Kuta was brought up in Pennsylvania, United States. He attended Atlantic College in Wales and then University College, Oxford, England, where he studied engineering science from 1974 to 1977, gaining a first class degree. While here, he also played tuba in the Oxcentrics, an Oxford-based Dixieland jazz band.

Kuta went on to study for a Master's degree at Stanford University in California, USA. While at Stanford, he was invited to be a co-founder of Silicon Graphics, Inc., by Dr. Jim Clark; the company was established in 1982. 

He was also involved in the design of the pipelined Geometry Engine that undertook 3D graphical transformations in hardware.

Subsequently, Kuta worked at Pellucid and co-founded Quantum3D in 1997, where he was Vice President of System Software Architecture. 

More recently, he has been based at Palm, Inc., now part of Hewlett-Packard.

References

1956 births
Living people
Engineers from Pennsylvania
People educated at Atlantic College
Alumni of University College, Oxford
Stanford University alumni
Computer hardware engineers
American software engineers
Businesspeople from California
Silicon Graphics people
Palm, Inc.
Hewlett-Packard people
Silicon Valley people
Oxcentrics members
English tubists
American electrical engineers